March of the Saint is the debut album by the American heavy metal band Armored Saint. It was released in 1984 on Chrysalis Records and recorded with producer Michael James Jackson who previously worked for Kiss. The debut album yielded a minor MTV hit with "Can U Deliver", but Joey Vera and John Bush later recalled the album's recording as a frustrating and disappointing experience, explaining that Jackson's approach was much more commercial than the heavy metal sound the band had wanted. As Vera recalled in 2006: "At the end of the record we were very unhappy with the production, the mix, the way we worked and who we worked with. And the producer and our manager let us spend over ($)300,000 on our first record. To this day we are still in debt for that one."

Track listing

Note 
The 2006 remastered edition, released by Rock Candy Records, includes a 16-page color booklet containing archive pictures and memorabilia, an extended essay by English music journalist Malcolm Dome, and new interviews with John Bush and Joey Vera.

Personnel
Band members
 John Bush – vocals
 Dave Prichard – lead guitar
 Phil Sandoval – lead guitar
 Joey Vera – bass
 Gonzo Sandoval – drums

Production
 Michael James Jackson – production
 Dave Whittman – mixing
 Chris Minto – engineering
 Steve MacMillan – assistant engineering
 Steve Hirsch – additional engineering
 Todd Prepsky – additional engineering
 David Egerton – additional engineering
 Bernie Grundman – mastering
 Ross Garfield – technician
 Bill Reed – technician
 Q Prime Inc., D.M.A. – management
 Gareth Williams – cover art
 John Pasche – art direction
 Neil Zlozower – photography

Solos 
1. solo: Dave Prichard; end solo: Phil E. Sandoval.
2. 1st solo: Dave Prichard; 2nd solo: Phil E. Sandoval.
3. solo: Dave Prichard; intro & end solos: Phil E. Sandoval.
4. solo: Phil E. Sandoval.
5. intro & 1st solos: Dave Prichard; 2nd solo: Phil E. Sandoval.
6. intro: Dave Prichard; solo: Phil E. Sandoval.
7. 1st solo: Phil E. Sandoval; 2nd solo: Dave Prichard.
8. 1st solo: Phil E. Sandoval; 2nd solo: Dave Prichard.
9. solo: Phil E. Sandoval.
10. 1st solo: Dave Prichard; 2nd & end solos: Phil E. Sandoval.

Charts 
Album

References

External links 
 Official band website
 [ Armored Saint] on AllMusic
 Armored Saint's March of the Saint on Encyclopaedia Metallum
 Music video for "Can U Deliver" on the official Metal Blade Records YouTube channel

1984 debut albums
Armored Saint albums
Chrysalis Records albums